USS Patapsco was a  ironclad monitor in the United States Navy during the American Civil War. She was named for the Patapsco River in Maryland.

Built in Wilmington, Delaware
Patapsco was the fourth U.S. Navy ship to bear that name. She was built by Harlan & Hollingsworth, Wilmington, Delaware; launched on 27 September 1862; and commissioned on 2 January 1863, Commander Daniel Ammen in command.

Civil War service

Assigned to the South Atlantic blockade
Assigned to the South Atlantic Blockading Squadron, she took part in a bombardment of Fort McAllister on 3 March. On 7 April, Patapsco joined eight other ironclads in a vigorous attack on Fort Sumter, and received 47 hits from Confederate gunfire during that day. 

Beginning in mid-July, she began her participation in a lengthy bombardment campaign against Charleston's defending fortifications. This led to the capture of Fort Wagner in early September. Fort Sumter was reduced to a pile of rubble, but remained a formidable opponent.

In November 1863, Patapsco tested a large obstruction-clearing explosive device that had been devised by John Ericsson. Remaining off South Carolina and Georgia during much of 1864 and into 1865, the monitor — or her boat crews — took part in a reconnaissance of the Wilmington River, Georgia, in January 1864 and helped capture or destroy enemy sailing vessels in February and November of that year.

Sunk by a mine
On 15 January 1865, while participating in obstruction clearance operations in Charleston Harbor, Patapsco struck a Confederate mine and sank, with 75 lost. The ship's Executive Officer, Lieutenant William T. Sampson was one of a handful of survivors.

References

Additional technical data from

External links

navsource.org: USS Patapsco
hazegray.org: USS Patapsco

 

Passaic-class monitors
Ships built by Harlan and Hollingsworth
1862 ships
Ships of the Union Navy
American Civil War monitors of the United States
American Civil War patrol vessels of the United States
Shipwrecks of the Carolina coast
Shipwrecks of the American Civil War
Maritime incidents in January 1865
Ships sunk by mines